HMS Aglaia was the French privateer Aglaé, captured in 1782 and brought into the Royal Navy. The Royal Navy sold her in 1783.

Capture
On 18 April 1782 Eolus was off Cape Cornwall on her way to Waterford when she encountered the French privateer Aglaé, of Saint Malo. After a chase of eight hours, Captain Collins of Eolus succeeded in capturing his quarry. She was a ship of twenty 6 and 9-pounder guns, with a crew of 121 men, under the command of Sieur Dugué du Laurent. She had been cruising for six days but had not taken any prizes.

Aglaé arrived at Plymouth 2 May. She then sat there and was never commissioned.

Fate
The Admiralty sold Aglaia on 5 June 1783.

Notes

Citations

References
 
 
 

Sloops of the United Kingdom
Sloops of the Royal Navy
Privateer ships of France
Captured ships
1780s ships